The Uttarakhand Kranti Dal (translation: Uttarakhand Revolutionary Party;  UKD), is a registered unrecognised regional political party in Uttarakhand, India. It bills itself as the only regional party of the Uttarakhand in contrast to the national parties that dominate the state's politics.

In the present Uttarakhand Legislative Assembly, elected in 2022, it does not have any member as compared with one member in the previous 2012, three members in 2007 and four members in 2002 assembly elections of the state.

History

The UKD was established on 26 July 1979 by Bipin Chandra Tripathi, Prof. Devi Datt Pant, Indramani Badoni
and Kashi Singh Airy at Nanital to fight for a separate state composed of the hill districts of Uttar Pradesh. The founding convention was chaired by Prof. Devi Datt Pant, former vice-chancellor of Kumaon University. Under the young leadership of Kashi Singh Airy who took the charge of struggle and public agitation and the aim was finally achieved, when the separate Uttaranchal state was formed on 9 November 2000, later renamed Uttarakhand in 2007. However, in the first-ever state assembly elections in 2002, the party won only four out of 70 seats and was outmaneuvered by the Indian National Congress and Bharatiya Janata Party, both despite being latecomers to the Uttarakhand statehood movement, succeeded in capturing its momentum for electoral gain and formed governments in the state

Leadership
The party's current face is Kashi Singh Airy, a prominent leader of the Uttarakhand statehood movement and a senior leader of Uttarakhand Kranti Dal, who was elected for Uttar Pradesh Legislative Assembly three times (1985–1989, 1989–1991, 1993–1996) from Didihat and was elected for first Uttarakhand Legislative Assembly. The executive president of the party is Harish Pathak along with Surendra Kukreti—senior statehood activists and prominent faces of Uttarakhand statehood movement who fought from the forefront in the creation of Uttarakhand state. Jaswant Singh Bisht was the first elected MLA of the party from Ranikhet constituency. Other personalities include Indramani Badoni, Devi Datt Pant, Bipin Chandra Tripathi and Diwakar Bhatt who were among the founding members and long time agitators for the Uttarakhand statehood movement.

Factionalism and decline 

In the 2012 Uttarakhand Assembly election, Uttarakhand Kranti Dal contested as Uttarakhand Kranti Dal (P) led by then party president Trivendra Singh Panwar. The original party name and the election symbol (chair) was frozen by the Election Commission of India following the factionalism and leadership dispute within the party that led to its breakup.
The splinter group Uttarakhand Kranti Dal (D) led by former MLA and Cabinet Minister in the Khanduri government and later Pokhriyal government, Diwakar Bhatt broke away from the UKD with his supporters claiming the original party leadership.
Pritam Singh Panwar was the only winning candidate of the party in the 2012 Assembly election, who ran under the UKD(P) banner.

Uttarakhand Kranti Dal's original name and party symbol were restored in 2017 with the merger of both groups.

The party's performance in various assembly and parliamentary elections has been on a consistent decline. The main reasons cited for UKD's decline in the politics of Uttarakhand are; inner factionalism, loss of voter base to other parties and frequent switching for power share between the BJP and Congress governments, which is often viewed negatively as political opportunism.

Electoral performance

Uttar Pradesh

Legislative Assembly elections

Lok Sabha elections

Uttarakhand

Legislative Assembly elections

Lok Sabha elections

See also

Revolutionary Party
List of socialist parties
Bharatiya Janata Party, Uttarakhand
Uttarakhand Pradesh Congress Committee

References

External links
Official Website of Uttarakhand Kranti Dal
A website established by UKD supporters.
उत्तराखण्ड क्रान्ति दल का इतिहास
A video of UKD public meeting
Uttarakhand Solidarity Network Web Portal Library
allindoon.com
legalassistanceforum.org  
lawcollegedehradun.com
garhwalpost.com

1979 establishments in Uttar Pradesh
Civic nationalism
Democratic socialist parties in Asia
Former member parties of the National Democratic Alliance
Former member parties of the United Progressive Alliance
Political parties established in 1979
Political parties in Uttarakhand
Regionalist parties in India
Registered unrecognised political parties in India
Socialist parties in India